Partenza may refer to:

 Partenza, a novel by Achille Essebac
 "La Partenza", a canzonetta by Pietro Metastasio
 Partenza (EP), an EP by Buono!